The Grand Tours are the three most prestigious multi-week stage races in professional road bicycle racing. The competitions are the Giro d'Italia, Tour de France and Vuelta a España, contested annually in that order. They are the only stage races permitted to last longer than 14 days.

The Giro d'Italia, Tour de France, and Vuelta a España are collectively known as the Grand Tours of cycling. The oldest of the races, the Tour, began in 1903, while the Giro first started in 1909 and the Vuelta in 1935. The modern editions of the races all consist of 21 days of racing with two rest days spread throughout race calendar, giving riders at most 63 chances to win a stage in a Grand Tour each year.

Winning a stage in a Grand Tour is a significant achievement and winning a stage in each Grand Tour is a rare feat that only 104 riders have achieved in their careers. Fiorenzo Magni was the first rider to win a stage in each Grand Tour with his victory in the stage 7 individual time trial at the 1955 Vuelta a España. The most recent rider to accomplish this task was Rigoberto Urán after he won stage 17 of the 2022 Vuelta a España.

Cyclists are ranked on the basis of their total stage wins in the three Grand Tours. When there is a tie between cyclists they are listed alphabetically. The majority of stage winners across the three tours have come from Europe, however, there have been a few non-European cyclists who have accomplished this feat. Colombian Luis Herrera was the first non-European rider to win a stage in each of the Grand Tours when he completed the triple with his victory in stage 13 at the 1989 Giro d'Italia. The first North American to complete this feat is Tyler Hamilton. American Tyler Farrar became the only other North American to do so with his victory in stage 3 of the 2011 Tour de France. Simon Gerrans became the first person from the Southern Hemisphere to win a stage at each Grand Tour with his victory at the 2009 Vuelta a España in tenth leg. Djamolidine Abdoujaparov is the only Asian cyclist on the list.

Eddy Merckx, with 64 victories, has won the most stages at the Grand Tours. Mario Cipollini is second with 57, Mark Cavendish is third with 53. Merckx and Cavendish have won the most Tour stages with 34, while Cipollini leads the tally for career stage wins at the Giro d'Italia with 42 to his name. Delio Rodríguez has the most stage wins in the history of the Vuelta a España (39 stages) but he failed to win any stages in the Tour de France or Giro d'Italia and is thus not represented in this list.

List

Riders in bold are still active.

Riders who have a stage at each Grand Tour in a calendar year
An ever rarer accomplishment is to win a stage at all the Grand Tours in one single calendar year. This feat has only been accomplished by three riders in history. The first rider was Spain's Miguel Poblet who won a total of eight stages at all three Grand Tours in 1956. Two years later, Pierino Baffi won six stages between all three Grand Tours. The third, and most recent, rider was Italian cyclist Alessandro Petacchi who won fifteen stages at the Grand Tours in 2003.

Doping

Four more riders (David Zabriskie, Jan Ullrich, Leonardo Piepoli and Alberto Contador) have won stages in all three Grand Tours, but all were retroactively stripped of stage wins.

 Jan Ullrich won seven individual stages at the Tour de France during his career and two stages in the 1999 Vuelta a España. He won an individual time trial at the 2006 Giro d'Italia but was later stripped of his results from May 2005 to June 2006 by the Court of Arbitration for Sports for his involvement in the Operación Puerto doping case.

 Alberto Contador is one of seven riders who won the general classification at all Grand Tours. Contador won two stages and the general classification of the 2011 Giro d'Italia, but lost his 2011 results due to a positive test for clenbuterol in the 2010 Tour de France. The CAS initially suspended Contador on 25 January 2011, but he appealed the decision, allowing him to compete in the 2011 Giro d'Italia and Tour de France. He lost his appeal on 6 February 2012 and was given a two-year ban with retroactive effect, starting from the day of his positive doping test on 21 July 2010, and was thereby stripped of his Giro results. Contador also won the Giro d'Italia in 2008 and 2015, but did so without winning a stage on both occasions.

References

Citations

Bibliography

 

Lists of cyclists
Grand Tour (cycling)
Grand Tour (cycling) stages